Delancey Lafayette Currence (born December 3, 1951) is a former Major League Baseball pitcher.

Currence pitched for Emmett Scott High School in Rock Hill and was signed as a free agent in 1970 by the Pittsburgh Pirates. In 1973, he was traded to the Milwaukee Brewers for Greg Erardi., and he pitched in the Class A Midwest League's 1974 All-Star Game, representing the Danville Warriors, a Brewers affiliate. That season, he led the Midwest League in strikeouts, fanning 184 batters in 191 innings, and racked up a 15–6 record with an ERA of 2.73.

Currence pitched at the Major League level with the Brewers in 1975 in eight games, making one start, wearing #20. He was called up from the Brewers' AA level Eastern League team, the Thetford Mines Miners in Thetford Mines, Quebec when pitcher Ed Sprague, Sr. was put on the 60-day disabled list in July 1975. Currence started the next season with the Spokane Indians, the Brewers' AAA farm club in the Pacific Coast League, and split time that season between Spokane and the Berkshire Brewers, the new Brewers' AA Eastern League farm team. His career in organized baseball ended with 4 games at the AA level in the Eastern League with the Holyoke Millers (the third Brewers-affiliated AA Eastern League location in three years) in 1977. The Brewers released him after he was diagnosed with tendonitis in his pitching arm. He attempted to keep in shape by playing amateur baseball in Rock Hill but was unable to return to professional baseball.

Currence was named to the York County (South Carolina) Sports Hall of Fame in 2011.

References

External links

1951 births
Living people
People from Rock Hill, South Carolina
Milwaukee Brewers players
Major League Baseball pitchers
Baseball players from South Carolina
African-American baseball players
Berkshire Brewers players
Charleston Pirates players
Danville Warriors players
Gulf Coast Pirates players
Holyoke Millers players
Monroe Pirates players
Niagara Falls Pirates players
Salem Pirates players
Spokane Indians players
Thetford Mines Miners players
Wilson Pennants players
American expatriate baseball players in Canada
21st-century African-American people
20th-century African-American sportspeople
American expatriate baseball players in the Dominican Republic